HR 244 is a single star in the constellation Cassiopeia. It has a yellow-white hue and is visible to the naked eye with an apparent visual magnitude of 4.80.

This object is an F-type star with a stellar classification of F9V. Despite the spectral class, evolutionary models show it to have left the main sequence and is now a subgiant. The star has 1.2 times the mass of the Sun and 1.8 times the Sun's radius.

References

F-type main-sequence stars
Cassiopeia (constellation)
Durchmusterung objects
Gliese and GJ objects
005015
004151
0244